The 1979–80 Duquesne Dukes men's basketball team represented Duquesne University in 1979–80 NCAA Division I men's basketball season.

Roster

Schedule

|-
!colspan=12 style=|EAAC tournament

|-
!colspan=9 style=| NIT

References 

1980 National Invitation Tournament participants
1979 in sports in Pennsylvania
1980 in sports in Pennsylvania
1979